Juan Bautista Aguirre y Carbo (Daule, Ecuador, April 11, 1725 - Tivoli, Italy, June 15, 1786) was a notable poet and writer from colonial South America. He is considered one of the precursors of Hispanic and Ecuadorian poetry.

Biography

Aguirre was the son of the militia captain Carlos Aguirre Ponce de Solis and Teresa Carbo Cerezo, both from Guayaquil. He studied at the San Luis Seminary College in Quito, where he lived for thirty years (almost half of his life). In 1758 he entered the Society of Jesus.

Aguirre taught in Quito at the San Gregorio Magno University until the Jesuits were expelled from Spanish America in 1767. On August 20 of that year he left South America from Guayaquil bound for Faenza, Italy, where the Jesuits of Quito had taken refuge.

Once in Italy, Aguirre was the superior of the Jesuit convent school in Ravenna and rector of the college in Ferrara. After the Order of the Jesuits was terminated by Pope Clement XIV in 1773, he settled in Rome under the papacy of Pope Pius VI. He was a friend of the bishop of Tivoli, Monsignor Gregorio Bamaba Chiaramonti, future Pope Pius VII.

Aguirre wrote poems of varying topics, including religious, moral, and love poems.

1725 births
1786 deaths
People from Daule Canton
Ecuadorian Jesuits
Ecuadorian people of Basque descent
Ecuadorian poets
Ecuadorian male poets
18th-century Ecuadorian people
18th-century poets
18th-century male writers
Jesuits expelled from the Americas